is a railway station in the city of Seki, Gifu Prefecture, Japan, operated by the third sector railway operator Nagaragawa Railway.

Lines

Station layout
Sekiguchi Station has one ground-level side platform serving a single bi-directional track. The station is unattended.

Adjacent stations

|-
!colspan=5|Nagaragawa Railway

History
Sekiguchi Station was opened on December 26, 1952. Operations were transferred from the Japan National Railway (JNR) to the Nagaragawa Railway on December 11, 1986.

Surrounding area
Gifu Prefectural Seki High School

See also
 List of Railway Stations in Japan

References

External links

 

Railway stations in Japan opened in 1952
Railway stations in Gifu Prefecture
Stations of Nagaragawa Railway
Seki, Gifu